The 2021 Minnesota Golden Gophers football team represented the University of Minnesota during the 2021 NCAA Division I FBS football season. The Golden Gophers played their home games at Huntington Bank Stadium in Minneapolis, Minnesota, and competed in the West Division of the Big Ten Conference. They were led by fifth-year head coach P. J. Fleck.

Previous season

The Golden Gophers finished the 2020 season 3-4 overall, and 3–4 in Big Ten play

Roster

Schedule

Game summaries

vs No. 4 Ohio State

The Golden Gophers opens the 2021 season at Huntington Bank Stadium, where they will host the 4th ranked team in the nation the Ohio State Buckeyes. This will be the 51st meeting between the 2 teams, with Ohio State having a winning record against the Gophers at 44-7-0. The Buckeyes have won 10 straight, which is their 2nd longest current Big Ten winning Streak. The teams last met in 2018, with the Buckeyes winning 30–14 at Ohio Stadium.

The TV Broadcast on Fox was the fourth most-watched broadcast television program of the week, averaging 6.295 million viewers. That is the largest audience for an opening-week college football telecast on Fox.

vs No. 14 Wisconsin

References

Minnesota
Minnesota Golden Gophers football seasons
Guaranteed Rate Bowl champion seasons
Minnesota Golden Gophers football